KXRV (107.5 FM) is a radio station in Bismarck, North Dakota (licensed to Cannon Ball), serving the Bismarck-Mandan area with a classic hits music format branded as "MOJO 107.5" that competes against Townsquare Media's KACL "Cool 98.7". The station broadcasts from a storefront studio on North 4th Street in Bismarck (along with sister station KKBO), with a lineup including several longtime Bismarck radio personalities.

History
Radio Assist Ministry (doing business as World Radio Link) intended on signing on a religious formatted station at 107.5 FM. Instead in June 2009, KXRV signed on with an adult contemporary format as "107.5 The River".

In October 2010, it was announced that Radio Assist Ministry was selling the station to Radio Bismarck Mandan, LLC (headed by Larry Schmidt). Radio Bismarck-Mandan previously owned radio stations in the Bismarck market before selling them to Clear Channel in 2004.

On November 1, 2011, KXRV switched to a classic hits format, following the sale to Radio Bismarck-Mandan.

External links
Official "Mojo 107.5" website

XRV
Classic hits radio stations in the United States